This is a list of Tamil language films produced in the Tamil cinema in India that were released in 2017.

Box office collection
Post-GST launch on 1 July 2017, Gross jumped to 137.44 per cent of Nett for all films. State Legislature passed the Tamil Nadu Local Bodies Entertainment Tax Act to repeal the Act of 1939. According to Ormax Media industry report, the Tamil film segment registered domestic nett box office receipts of ₹1,191 crore.

The highest-grossing Tamil films released in 2017, by worldwide box office gross revenue, are as follows.

2017 films

January–March

April–June

July–September

October–December

Awards

References

{{|date=May 2019}}
Tamil
2017
Tamil
2010s Tamil-language films